Erda Sieglinde Walsh is a Canadian former politician. She served as MLA for the Kootenay riding in the Legislative Assembly of British Columbia from 1996 to 2001, as a member of the British Columbia New Democratic Party.

Prior to entering politics, Walsh worked at the Cranbrook Regional Hospital, owned a small business and worked as a paramedic for the B.C. Ambulance Service. She also served on the city council for Cranbrook.

References

Living people
British Columbia New Democratic Party MLAs
Women MLAs in British Columbia
People from Hildesheim
German emigrants to Canada
1952 births